Eilema iuniformis is a moth of the  subfamily Arctiinae. It is found in Burma.

References

 Natural History Museum Lepidoptera generic names catalog

iuniformis